The Battle of Grčarice was a battle fought in early September 1943 between the Slovene Partisans and the Blue Guard. The battle was waged in Grčarice in German-occupied Yugoslavia, modern-day Slovenia.

Background 
The capitulation of Italy was an important turning point in the World War II in Slovenian part of Axis occupied Kingdom of Yugoslavia. Slovene Partisans had a British mission inside their headquarter. Based on the instructions received from the Allies, the Italian troops were ordered to surrender their arms to the Partisans in Yugoslavia, which allowed Slovene Partisans to significantly strengthen their forces. The  Slovene Partisans immediately used this arms to eliminate their main political opponents, Slovenian detachment of the Yugoslav Army in Homeland.

Forces

National Liberation Army and Partisan Detachments of Slovenia 

Slovene Partisans which attacked Yugoslav Army in Grčarice belonged to three shock brigades (Tomšič, Šercer and Gradnik) of the 14th Slovenian Division. After the capitulation of Italy in 1943 the Slovene Partisans captured 2 heavy guns together with its crew that they brought to Grčarice. According to an interview of former Chetnik officer Uroš Šušterič, the Italian soldiers operated artillery weapons used against Chetniks.

Slovenian Chetniks 

The commander of all Chetniks in Slovenia was Karl Novak. Most of Slovene Chetniks in Grčarice were members of the Sokol movement. Chetnik detachment in Grčarice was the main Slovene Chetnik group. Their number grew from 50 initially to 350. Their official name was Dolenjska Chetnik Detachment while they were also known as the Central Chetnik Detachment About 60 of them were officers or non-commissioned officers. Dolenjska Chetnik Detachment was commanded by the Major Danilo Borut Koprivica. It had four battalions, the first commanded by Captain Pavle Vošmar Vidmar,  the second by Milan Kranjc, third by Marjan Strniša and fourth by Stanko Abram.

Chetniks in Grčarice expected reinforcements consisting of Chetniks from Ljubljana and around 300 Chetniks from Lika region. Only small detachment of 20 Chetniks from Ljubljana managed to reach Grčarice and reinforce defenders. One detachment of 270 Chetniks from Lika commanded by Vasilije Marović was sent by Major Bjelajac to join Chetniks in Slovenia, tried to reach Grčarice, but returned after reaching Srbske Moravice where they learned about the Italian capitulation and decided to return.

Battle 

The prelude of the Battle of Grčarice were the clashes between the Partisans and Chetniks in Sveti Gregor on 3 September. After being attacked by the Partisan brigade Tone Tomšič, the Chetnik forces retreated to Grčarice where they had their center and headquarters. The Chetniks immediately fortified their positions connecting two buildings and the church. On 5 September Chetniks received two trucks of arms and ammunition, because Italian General Gambara wanted to establish connection with the Allies.

On 6 September the Chetniks in Grčarice celebrated the birthday of Peter II of Yugoslavia.

On 7 September Partisans encircled Grčarice and on 8 September they began the attack on Grčarice. On the first day of attack the  Slovene Partisans did not have any heavy weapons, so Chetniks successfully repelled all their attacks.

Major Novak was in Ljubljana during this battle and commanded his units through radio connection. Expecting the reinforcement from Chetniks from Lika, he continually sent instructions to Dolenjska Chetniks Detachment to keep their positions. When Koprivica was wounded he appointed Captain Milan Kranjc to take over the command over the detachment. On 9 September 20 Chetniks of the Ljubljana detachment joined surrounded Chetniks.

When Kranjc realized that the Chetnik units can not withheld the Partisans attacks he planned to break through their lines during the night. In midnight Kranjc shouted to Partisans explaining them that their political commissars are guilty for crimes against Slovenian people and accusing them for attacking regular Yugoslav army units instead against Nazi troops that occupied their country. Kranjc invited Partisan soldiers to kill their political commissars and join Chetniks in their struggle against occupation. When Kranjc was wounded by  partisan artillery fire, Marijan Strniša – Pribina took command over the surrounded Chetnik forces.

According to post-war Yugoslav sources both Koprivica and Kranjc committed suicide to avoid capture by the Partisans.

Forces of Yugoslav Army in the Homeland suffered defeat and had 11 killed soldiers and 171 captured.

According to Vladimir Dedijer, Partisans occupied Grčarice on 9 September 1943. Among the Chetniks captured by the Partisans was Vladimir Kalan, who worked for Allied intelligence and was released after he claimed British citizenship.

Kočevje trials 

The Liberation Front of the Slovene Nation organized trials for captured Yugoslav soldiers between 9 and 11 October 1943. The Liberation Front of the Slovene Nation organized a trial to 21 captured Yugoslav officers, condemning to death 16 of them while 5 were sentenced to forced labor.

Besides nine prisoners who escaped and those who were put on trial and sentenced to death, all other prisoners were secretly executed in November and December 1943 on many different places in Kočevje although they surrendered after Partisans guaranteed their lives which was a condition for their surrender.

Aftermath 

On 19 September 1943 around 700 members of Slovenian detachments of Yugoslav Army in the Homeland surrendered to Slovene Partisans in Turjak Castle after the Siege of Turjak.

Slovenian historian Janez Grum emphasized that the defeat of Chetniks in three day battle of Grčarice was serious blow for anti-communist Slovenians and their resistance to communist terror.

After the defeat in Grčarice only small scattered groups of Chetniks in Slovenia continued to exist, while Major Novak resigned as their commander. Dragoslav Mihailović appointed Ivan Prezelj as new commander of the Slovenian units of the Yugoslav Army in the Homeland. Prezelj commanded over small number of Chetnik detachments until the end of the World War II.

The Slovene Home Guard was established as a reaction to massacres and inadmissible actions of Partisans connected with battles of Turjak and Grčarice.

Legacy 

In his postwar work, Edvard Kardelj recounted that, until the capitulation of Italy and destruction of the Slovenian detachment of the Yugoslav Army in the Homeland in Grčarice, Joseph Stalin had insisted that the Chetniks and Partisans should "reach an agreement at any price ... in order to create an army under the command of Draža Mihailović."

References

Sources 

 
 
 
 
 
 
 
 
 
 
 
 
 
 
 

Conflicts in 1943
Slovenia in World War II
Yugoslavia in World War II
Slovene Partisans
Battles involving the Yugoslav Partisans
1943 in Yugoslavia
September 1943 events
Sieges of World War II
Battles of World War II involving Chetniks